D Is For Dragon Dance is a 2007 children's picture book written by Ying Chang Compestine and illustrated by Yongsheng Xuan. The book explores the Chinese New Years traditions through a rhyming acrostic format using the English alphabet. The book concludes with an author's note, an artist's note, and a recipe for "New Year's Dumpling Delight".

Featured Chinese New Year traditions 
A few of the Chinese New Year traditions featured in the book include:
 Watching the Dragon Dance performance in the New Year's parade
 Lighting firecrackers
 Hanging paper lanterns
 Eating Peking Duck
 Children receiving Red Envelopes full of gifts
 Eating Steamed Dumplings
 Performing Venerationfor one's ancestors
 Creating Xylographs
 Welcoming the Chinese Zodiac for the new year

Reception 
D Is For Dragon Dance has received praise from several organizations including Kirkus Reviews, and Booklist.

References 

2007 children's books
American picture books
Picture books by Ying Chang Compestine
Chinese New Year children's books